The 1937 Georgetown Hoyas football team was an American football team that represented Georgetown University as an independent during the 1937 college football season. In their sixth season under head coach Jack Hagerty, the Hoyas compiled a 2–4–2 record and were outscored by a total of 71 to 70. The team played its home games at Griffith Stadium in Washington, D.C.

Schedule

References

Georgetown
Georgetown Hoyas football seasons
Georgetown Hoyas football